Krmelín is a municipality and village in Frýdek-Místek District in the Moravian-Silesian Region of the Czech Republic. It has about 2,300 inhabitants.

History
The first written mention of Krmelín is from 1447.

Notable people
Vítězslav Mácha (born 1948), wrestler, Olympic winner

References

External links

Villages in Frýdek-Místek District